Anghiari is a hill town and municipality (comune) in the Province of Arezzo, Tuscany, Italy.

Bordering comuni include Arezzo (southwest), Pieve Santo Stefano (north) and Subbiano (west).

History
The Battle of Anghiari took place on 29 June 1440 between the Republic of Florence and the Duchy of Milan. The battle inspired a Leonardo da Vinci fresco designed for Florence's Palazzo Vecchio known as the Lost Leonardo; current scholarship holds that the work was never completed. It is known from da Vinci drafts and a sketch of it by Peter Paul Rubens now in the Louvre.

During World War II, the concentration camp of Renicci was located at Anghiari.

Culture
The Anghiari Festival, featuring classical music, chamber music, choral music, and opera, is held each July. The resident orchestra is London's Southbank Sinfonia, conducted by Simon Over.

Main sights
 Palazzo Pretoriano
 Badia di San Bartolomeo
 Villa La Barbolana
 Castello di Galbino

References

External links
 Official website

Cities and towns in Tuscany
Hilltowns in Tuscany